Praomys coetzeei is a species of mouse in the family Muridae.

References
Van der Straeten, E. 2008. Notes on the Praomys of Angola with the description of a new species (Mammalia: Rodentia: Muridae). Stuttgarter Beiträge zur Naturkunde 1: 123–131.

Endemic fauna of Angola
Praomys
Mammals described in 2008